The 2011 NBA Development League Draft was the 11th of the National Basketball Association Development League (NBDL). The draft was held on November 3, 2011 before the 2011–12 season. In this draft, all 16 of the league's teams took turns selecting eligible players. Jamaal Tinsley was the first overall draft pick by the Los Angeles D-Fenders.

Key

Draft

References

NBA G League draft
Draft
National Basketball Association lists
NBA Development League draft